Zhangixalus  is a genus of frogs in the subfamily Rhacophorinae, family Rhacophoridae. They are collectively known as Zhang's treefrogs. They occur in the Eastern Himalayas, southern China, Taiwan, Japan, and southeast Asia.

Etymology
The name of the genus honors Zhang Ya-Ping from the Chinese Academy of Sciences, in recognition to his contributions to biodiversity and evolution research in China, in combination with ixalus, a common generic root for treefrogs.

Taxonomy
Zhangixalus was erected in a 2019 revision of the then very large genus Rhacophorus (92 species) that was split in three lineages: Rhacophorus sensu stricto (then 39 species; as of November 2021, 43 species), resurrected Leptomantis (then 14 species; as of November 2021, 13 species), and Zhangixalus (then 37 species; as of November 2021, 40 species). The split was based on molecular data, but was supported by morphological characteristics and differences in geographic distribution. Rhacophorus is the sister taxon to the clade formed by Zhangixalus and Leptomantis.

Description
The snout is rounded. The terminal phalanges of fingers and toes are Y-shaped. Dorsal skin is smooth or scattered with small tubercles. Most species have green dorsal coloration. Reproduction involves white foam nests produced by breeding pairs.

Zhangixalus, as delimited by Jiang and colleagues, includes a deeply divergent clade containing Z. achantharrhena, Z. dulitensis, and Z. prominanus. They differ from other Zhangixalus by possessing dermal folds along limbs and tarsal projections. The placement of these species is tentative, pending further study.

Zhangixalus are mostly larger than their closest relative, Leptomantis, and have generally green dorsal coloration, instead of light tan or reddish brown. They differ from Rhacophorus sensu stricto by lacking dermal folds along limbs and tarsal projections.

Species
There are 41 recognized species:

The AmphibiaWeb recognizes the same species except Zhangixalus amamiensis, which is treated as being part of Zhangixalus viridis.

References

Rhacophoridae
 
Amphibian genera
Amphibians of Asia